Silahdar Damat Ali Pasha (1667 – 5 August 1716), also called Silahdar Ali Pasha, was an Ottoman general and Grand Vizier. His epithet silahdar means arms bearer and damat means bridegroom, because he married Fatma Sultan.

Early life
Ali Pasha was born to a Turkish family in Iznik (ancient Nicaea), in modern Turkey. His father's name was Hacı Hüseyin. He was trained in the Enderun palace school in İstanbul and during the reign of Mustafa II he was appointed to be the personal secretary of the sultan. In 1709, he was engaged to the daughter of Ahmet III, gaining the title damat and was appointed as the Second Vizier. On 27 April 1713, he became the Grand Vizier.

Term as Grand Vizier

Shortly after his appointment, he succeeded in ratifying the Treaty of Pruth with Russia, thus securing the northern frontiers of the Ottoman Empire at Dnieper River.

By early 1714, his attention shifted to the Morea, which had been held by the Republic of Venice since the Morean War and the 1699 Treaty of Karlowitz. The Ottomans had never been reconciled to its loss. When the Venetians gave refuge to Serbian rebels from Montenegro and Herzegovina in their Dalmatian province, and some of their merchants were involved in disputes with Ottoman vessels, the Ottoman Porte (government) swiftly used this as a pretext to declare war.

The subsequent campaign in 1715, led by Silahdar Ali Pasha himself, was an overwhelming success, as the entire Morea fell quickly and with little bloodshed to the Ottoman army.

However, Habsburg Austria, an ally of Venice, also declared war against the Ottomans. In 1716, Ali Pasha moved to Austrian front where he commanded the Ottoman army against the Austrian forces led by Prince Eugene of Savoy at the Battle of Petrovaradin (5 August 1716). During the battle Ali Pasha lost his life. His tomb is in Belgrade.

After his death he was called Şehit Ali Pasha 
(Şehit  means martyr).

See also

 Damat Ali-Paša's Turbeh

References

1667 births
1716 deaths
18th-century Grand Viziers of the Ottoman Empire
Pashas
Ottoman military personnel killed in action
Turks from the Ottoman Empire
People from İznik
Damats
Ottoman people of the Ottoman–Venetian Wars
Austro-Turkish War (1716–1718)